Veysel Atasoy (1947, Zonguldak – 24 August 2004, Ankara) was a Turkish politician who served as the Minister of Transport in the 45th government of Turkey and the Minister of Energy and Natural Resources in the 50th government of Turkey.

Early and personal life 
Atasoy was born in 1947 in Zonguldak. He attended the Kabataş High School before going to the Faculty of Political Science of Ankara University in 1971 and the Institution of Social Science at Istanbul University. He had two children. His sister was married with Turkish singer .

Career 
He was one of the founding members of the Motherland Party. He served as the Minister of Transport in the 45th government of Turkey and the Minister of Energy and Natural Resources in the 50th government of Turkey. Additionally, he was a member of the 17th, 18th, 19th, 20th, and 21st Parliaments of Turkey from the Motherland Party and the True Path Party.

Death 
Atasoy died on 24 August 2004 after being admitted to hospital for complications with his pulmonary pleurae. He was buried on 26 August at the Cebeci Asri Cemetery.

References 

1947 births
2004 deaths
Members of the 17th Parliament of Turkey
Members of the 18th Parliament of Turkey
Members of the 19th Parliament of Turkey
Members of the 20th Parliament of Turkey
Members of the 21st Parliament of Turkey
Transport ministers of Turkey
Ministers of Energy and Natural Resources of Turkey